The following lists events that happened during 2012 in Bahrain.

Incumbents
 Monarch: Hamad ibn Isa Al Khalifa
 Prime Minister: Khalifa bin Salman Al Khalifa

Events

January

 January 1 - A funeral of a Bahraini youth killed the previous day (December 31) in a protest turns into another protest with police forced to use tear gas.
 January 15 - Opposition leaders and activists say reforms proposed by King Hamad bin Isa Al Khalifa are "cosmetic" and will do little to stop the uprising.
 January 27 - Amnesty International calls for an investigation into the fatal tear gassing of residential areas by Bahraini security forces.

References

 
2010s in Bahrain
Years of the 21st century in Bahrain
Bahrain
Bahrain